Taybi syndrome may refer to:

Oto-palato-digital syndrome, formerly known as Taybi syndrome
Rubinstein–Taybi syndrome, a syndrome characterized by unusual facial traits and broad thumbs and toes.
Taybi–Linder syndrome, also known as cephaloskeletal dysplasia